Podrug is a Croatian surname. Notable people with the surname include:

Emilija Podrug (born 1979), Croatian basketball player
Junius Podrug (born 1947), American author and lawyer

See also
Prodrug

Croatian surnames